Bandhan Bank Ltd. is a banking and financial services company, headquartered in Kolkata. Bandhan Bank is present in 34 out of 36 states and union territories of India, with 5,723 banking outlets and more than 2.86 crore customers. Having received the universal banking licence from the Reserve Bank of India, Bandhan Bank started operations on August 23, 2015, with 501 branches, 50 ATMs and 2,022 Banking Units (BUs). The Bank has mobilised deposits of over ₹1,02,283 crore and its total advances stand at over ₹97,787 crore as of December 31, 2022.

History 
Bandhan was set up in 2001 as a not-for-profit entity with the objective of financial inclusion and women empowerment through sustainable livelihood creation. It started its microfinance operations from Bagnan, a small village, about 60 km from Kolkata. The model followed for delivery of microfinance services was individual lending through group formation. Bandhan focused on serving underbanked and underpenetrated markets.  

In 2006, Bandhan acquired a Non-Banking Financial Company (NBFC) and created Bandhan Financial Services Private Limited (BFSPL) to scale up its microfinance activities. In 2010, it became the largest microfinance institution (MFI) in the country. 

In April  2014, Bandhan received an in-principle approval from the Reserve Bank of India (RBI). On June 17, 2015, RBI granted the banking licence to Bandhan, making it the first-ever microfinance institution to become a universal bank in India. 

Bandhan Bank commenced operations on August 23, 2015. The then Union Finance Minister, Late Shri Arun Jaitley, inaugurated the Bank in Kolkata. Its public shareholders then included International Finance Corporation; Caladium Investment Pte Ltd (the sovereign wealth fund of Singapore, an arm of GIC); and Small Industries Development Bank of India (SIDBI).

On 27 March 2018, Bandhan Bank was listed on the bourses and became the 8th largest bank in India by market capital, on the day of listing itself.

Operations 
Bandhan Bank through its network of 5,639 banking outlets is spread across metro, urban, semi-urban and rural India. The key focus areas are micro-entrepreneurs, MSME segment, housing finance and retail assets. It is interesting to note that 84.5% of the Bank's deposits are in the retail segment, thus, granular in nature. 

Bandhan Bank is focused on inclusive banking and reaches out to the unbanked and under-banked segments of the country, with 73% of its branches situated in rural and semi-urban areas.

Products and services 
The Bank's products and services ranges from savings to current accounts, from fixed deposits to credit cards, from home loans to personal loans, from insurance to mutual funds, and more.

Merger
In October 2019, Bandhan Bank acquired GRUH Finance Limited, a Housing Development Finance Corporation Limited backed housing finance company in the share-swap deal by way of scheme of amalgamation, in order to venture into the affordable housing finance.

Investors 
Bandhan Bank is an associate of Bandhan Financial Holdings Limited (BFHL) which is holding 39.99% of stake in the Bank as on December 31, 2021. Further, BFHL is a wholly owned subsidiary of Bandhan Financial Services Limited (BFSL). Other major shareholders of the Bank as on December 31, 2021, are Housing Development Finance Corporation Limited (9.89%), and Caladium Investment Pte. Limited (7.79%).

Listing and shareholding 
The equity shares of Bandhan Bank are listed on the BSE Limited and the National Stock Exchange of India Limited. The IPO of the Bank oversubscribed by almost 15 times at the end of the three-day long issue. On its stock exchange debut (March 27, 2018), the equity opened at ₹487.33 on the National Stock Exchange and closed at ₹476.85; 27% over its issue price of ₹375. 

*Other promoters i.e. Bandhan Financial Services Limited, North East Financial Inclusion Trust, Financial Inclusion Trust, and Bandhan Konnagar, the Promoter Group, are not holding any equity shares in the Bank.

See also

 Banking in India
 List of banks in India
 Reserve Bank of India
 Indian Financial System Code
 List of companies of India

References

Private sector banks in India
Banks established in 2014
Microfinance companies of India
Microfinance banks
Community development organizations
Companies based in Kolkata
Banks based in Kolkata
Bandhan Bank
2014 establishments in West Bengal
Companies listed on the National Stock Exchange of India
Companies listed on the Bombay Stock Exchange